An Apostle of Non-Violence is a 1997 Cambodian short feature film written, produced, and directed by King Norodom Sihanouk. Starring Khai Prasith, the film tells the story of a Buddhist monk trying to preach non-violence to opposing groups of a civil war. King Norodom wrote the film's screenplay in 1994, with production underway by 1996.

An Apostle of Non-Violence was screened on March 29, 1997 for the opening ceremony of the 1st Southeast Asian Biennial Film Festival, hosted by Cambodia, and it has since been released on DVD.

Plot
A Buddhist monk tries to preach non-violence to the Khmum-Chachak rebels and the National Army, who are in the midst of a civil war that can dangerously affect innocent civilians.

Cast
Khai Prasith
Saroeun Sophirom
Kong Sophy
Chorn Torn

References

External links

1997 films
1997 drama films
Cambodian drama films
Films about violence
Khmer-language films
Cambodian short films